Quebrada Maracuto, in the municipality of Carolina, Puerto Rico, is a prehistoric rock art site.  It was listed on the National Register of Historic Places in 2004.

The site includes seven boulders with petroglyphs.

Images in the petroglyphs include faces and a carved clockwise spiral.

References

Carolina, Puerto Rico
Archaeological sites on the National Register of Historic Places in Puerto Rico
Rock art in North America
Petroglyphs